Mice is the plural form of mouse, a rodent.

Mice or MICE may also refer to:

Acronyms
 International Muon Ionization Cooling Experiment
 Meetings, incentives, conferencing, exhibitions
 Metafile image code execution
 Multiple imputation of chained equations
 Member of the Institution of Civil Engineers
 Money, Ideology, Compromise, and Ego, an acronym in counter-human intelligence for reasons why people commit treason

Art, entertainment, and media

Fictional entities

Music
Mice, a band formed by Julianne Regan of All About Eve fame
The Mice (band), a pop band based in Cleveland, USA

Television
"The Mice" (The Outer Limits), a 1964 episode of the television series

Science and technology
Mice Galaxies, NGC 4676, two merging spiral galaxies
Plural of mouse (computing)

See also 
 Mouse (disambiguation)